Dražovice may refer to places in the Czech Republic:

Dražovice (Klatovy District), a municipality and village in the Plzeň Region
Dražovice (Vyškov District), a municipality and village in the South Moravian Region